Main Square may refer to:
 Main Square, Plzeň
 Main Square (Bratislava)
 Main Square, Kraków
 Main Square, Maribor
 Main Square Festival, named after the Grand-Place in Arras, France
 Main Square (Toronto), a building complex

See also
 Town square
 Market square
 City square (disambiguation)
 Plaza Mayor (disambiguation) (Spanish)
 Grand-Place (French)
 Grote Markt (disambiguation) (Dutch)
 Hauptplatz (disambiguation) (German)